Ray Bisby was the acting Police and Crime Commissioner for Cambridgeshire until May 2021, representing the Conservative Party. He is also a Councillor at Peterborough City Council for the Stanground South Ward.

He was appointed to the post in November 2019 following the resignation of Jason Ablewhite who resigned after a social media scandal. He was succeeded by Darryl Preston of the Conservative Party.

References

Living people
Police and crime commissioners in England
Conservative Party police and crime commissioners
Conservative Party (UK) councillors
Councillors in Peterborough
Year of birth missing (living people)